Guramar Singh Virdi (born 19 July 1998), known as Amar Virdi, is an English cricketer. An off-spin bowler, Virdi played in two Under-19 internationals for England against Sri Lanka in 2016. He made his first-class debut for Surrey in the 2017 County Championship on 26 May 2017.

Career
Virdi was the leading English-born spin bowler in the 2018 County Championship with 39 wickets. He struggled with a stress injury to his back in January 2019, which kept him out of the opening weeks of the 2019 cricket season, and was asked by Surrey to lose some weight and improve his fitness while he recovered. Surrey's director of cricket, Alec Stewart, called it "tough love". When Virdi returned to the Surrey team in mid-July for his first match of the season he took 14 wickets in the victory over Nottinghamshire: 8 for 61 and 6 for 78.

On 29 May 2020, Virdi was named in a 55-man group of players to begin training ahead of international fixtures starting in England following the COVID-19 pandemic. On 17 June 2020, Virdi was included in England's 30-man squad to start training behind closed doors for the Test series against the West Indies.

In December 2020, Virdi was named as one of seven reserve players in England's Test squad for their series against Sri Lanka. In January 2021, he was also named as a reserve player in England's Test squad for their series against India.

Personal life
Virdi is a practising Sikh. His family originate from the Punjab, but his parents emigrated to the UK from Kenya and Uganda. He grew up in a sporting family: his father represented Kenya in junior tennis and his brother introduced him to cricket. As a teenager, he turned down offers of scholarships from private schools because he didn't wish to board, and because he had been playing adult cricket since he was 13.

References

External links
 

1998 births
Living people
English cricketers
Surrey cricketers
Somerset cricketers
People from Chiswick
Cricketers from Greater London
English people of Punjabi descent
English Sikhs